Hohenwarsleben is a village and a former municipality in the Börde district in Saxony-Anhalt, Germany. Since 1 January 2010, it is part of the municipality of Hohe Börde.

Hohenwarsleben location is close to the city of Magdeburg, capital of Saxony-Anhalt. As a result of its location, the village is inhabited by many people, who work in Magdeburg and only live in the village. Within 20 min, by car, Magdeburg could be reached via the B1 (country road) or within 10 min via the highway.

External links 

Former municipalities in Saxony-Anhalt
Hohe Börde